The Mendocino Beacon is a weekly newspaper for the community of Mendocino, California, owned by MediaNews Group.

History
The Mendocino Beacon was founded on October 6, 1877 by W. H. Meacham and William Heeser, an immigrant from Germany who also founded the Fort Bragg Advocate-News and three other local newspapers in Kibesillah, Rockport, and Westport. It succeeded the Star, a local newspaper that had been founded previously by M. J. C. Galvin. In an 1878 catalog of North American newspapers the Beacon was advertised as "an independent and vigorous weekly journal, published at a point of rising importance as a place of shipping and trade." From 1975 to 1977 it was published under an alternative name, the Mendocino Coast Beacon.

In 2000, the newspaper offices moved from Mendocino to Fort Bragg, ten miles north of Mendocino, and consolidated with the offices of the Fort Bragg Advocate-News.

Recognition
In the 2009 California Newspaper Publishers Association's "Better Newspaper Contest", the Mendocino Beacon won first place in its circulation category for a business/financial story, for a story on Heritage House by Frank Hartzell. It has also won similar awards in previous years.

References

Weekly newspapers published in California
Companies based in Mendocino County, California
Publications established in 1877
1877 establishments in California